The Boy Who Owned a Melephant is a 1959 American short film directed by Saul Swimmer and featuring Tallulah Bankhead as narrator.

Plot
After seeing his first circus, young Johnnie (Brockman Seawell) asks for an elephant to keep as a pet. To placate him, his mother (Molly Turner) whimsically "gives" him the elephant in the local zoo. The boy's classmates resent his pride in "owning" the pachyderm, and the boy learns to share, making his peers equal "owners".

Production
Shortly after graduating from Carnegie Mellon University in Pittsburgh, Pennsylvania, future feature-film director-producer Saul Swimmer directed the half-hour children's short "The Boy Who Owned a Melephant". Co-written by Swimmer and Tony Anthony, adapting a story by Marvin Wald, it was produced by a team credited as Gayle-Swimmer-Anthony, which included frequent collaborator Peter Gayle. It was released by Universal Pictures on October 6, 1959 or November 9, 1959 (sources differ). Narrated by actress Tallulah Bankhead, it starred her godson, Brockman Seawell, actress Eugenia Rawls' son,  and played the Palace Theatre in New York City.

The film screened at the 1959  San Francisco International Film Festival, and won a 1959 Gold Leaf award at the Venice International Children's Film Festival. On March 19, 1967, it was paired with the 1952 French short "White Mane" as an episode of the television anthology series CBS Children's Film Festival.

References

External links

1959 films
1959 short films
American short films
Universal Pictures short films
1950s English-language films
Films directed by Saul Swimmer